"I'm Leavin" is a song by Outsidaz featuring Rah Digga and Melanie Blatt, which was released as a single in March 2002 in the United Kingdom and Europe. Kelis is the featured on the album version, but on the single and video a collaboration is done with Melanie.

Track list

Charts

Video
The I'm Leavin video was shot in a New Jersey ghetto.

Remixes
I'm Leavin
 Clean edit
 Full length clean
 Grunge Boyz vocal dub remix
 Oddsmakers remix – clean

2002 singles
Kelis songs
Outsidaz songs
Melanie Blatt songs
Songs written by Stuart Zender